New Haven Township is one of the nineteen townships of Huron County, Ohio, United States. As of the 2010 census the population of the township was 2,621, down from 2,860 in 2000. As of 2010, 1,712 of the population lived in the unincorporated portions of the township.

Geography
Located on the southern edge of the county, it borders the following townships:
Greenfield Township - north
Fairfield Township - northeast corner
Ripley Township - east
Cass Township, Richland County - southeast
Plymouth Township, Richland County - south
Auburn Township, Crawford County - southwest
Richmond Township - west
Norwich Township - northwest corner

Several populated places are located in or adjacent to New Haven Township:
The city of Willard, bordering the township to the northwest
Part of the village of Plymouth, in the south
The unincorporated community of Celeryville, on the border with Richmond Township in the northwest
The unincorporated community of New Haven, in the center.

Name and history
New Haven Township was established in 1815. The township is named after New Haven, Connecticut, the native home of a share of the early settlers. It is the only New Haven Township statewide.

Government
The township is governed by a three-member board of trustees, who are elected in November of odd-numbered years to a four-year term beginning on the following January 1. Two are elected in the year after the presidential election and one is elected in the year before it. There is also an elected township fiscal officer, who serves a four-year term beginning on April 1 of the year after the election, which is held in November of the year before the presidential election. Vacancies in the fiscal officership or on the board of trustees are filled by the remaining trustees.

References

External links
New Haven Township official website
County website

Townships in Huron County, Ohio
Townships in Ohio